AirMech is a video game soundtrack album by Vancouver industrial band Front Line Assembly. The album was released by Carbon Games in 2012 as the soundtrack for free-to-play real-time strategy game AirMech.

Release
AirMech was released as limited edition CD album and digital download. Each item of the CD version contained a code which granted access to exclusive game content and design. Canadian label Artoffact Records re-released AirMech in 2014 as double vinyl in different variations.

Background
The album was announced in September 2012. Carbon Games' Game Director James Green said, "The first thing I thought of was trying to get music that sounded like Front Line Assembly". The band agreed, on the condition that members could be included in the game with "crazy sonic weapons". During the production process the band wrote "a wide range of tracks that would be suitable for AirMech, from menus to ingame music."

Critical reception

AirMech received mainly positive reviews. However, some critics thought AirMech is bound too much by the limitations of a video game soundtrack.

Gregory Burkart of FEARnet wrote, "AirMech is a definite keeper for FLA fans and anyone who grooves on dark, violent and cinematic-scale industrial & EBM". He felt that AirMech "follows through in some ways from the band's previous earth-shaking album 'Improvised Electronic Device'", but also brought some innovations: "The real departure on AirMech is the introduction of orchestral elements, something the band only incorporated only loosely in the past, and then in a more experimental way."

Jaymie Burzette of Coma Magazine emphasized how AirMech contrasts with other Front Line Assembly releases, saying, "AirMech is very different from normal Front Line Assembly fare. Instead of their usual Electro-Industrial sound, this album contains all instrumental tracks and bears a heavy Dubstep influence."

Trubie Turner of ReGen Magazine was more critical of the fact that AirMech is a video game score, pointing out, "Fans of Front Line Assembly are sure to find AirMech to be an odd experience". Turner called the album "an impressive showcase of Front Line Assembly's talent". However, "it can still feel overly repetitive and too heavily focused on loop ready riffs at times", Turner wrote and concluded, "Outside of the context of the game though, this purely instrumental work impresses but does not captivate."

Barcode Magazine, otherwise generally favorable of AirMech, found it to be "a downside [...] that AirMech had to be written to correspond to a particular soundtrack-style, which somewhat restricts the album from becoming what it could have been."

Track listing

Personnel

Front Line Assembly
 Bill Leeb – vocals, electronic instruments
 Jared Slingerland – electronic instruments
 Jeremy Inkel – strings recording, electronic instruments

Additional musicians
 Craig Johnsen – additional programming (1, 2, 5, 7–9, 11, 12), song writing (1, 2, 5, 7–9, 11, 12)
 Sasha Keevill – additional programming (3, 4), song writing (3, 4)
 Meghan Engle – live strings (1, 7, 11)
 Nigel Befus – live strings (1, 7, 11)

Technical personnel
 Greg Reely – mixing, mastering
 James Green – album artwork
 Weng Chen – album artwork

WarMech

In January 2015, Front Line Assembly announced that they started working on a follow-up album to AirMech. The album, titled WarMech, was released June 22, 2018.

References

External links
 AirMech on the Steam platform
 AirMech site at Carbon Games

2012 albums
Front Line Assembly albums
2012 soundtrack albums
Metropolis Records albums
Dependent Records albums